The Dessert Museum is an interactive art exhibition, or "selfie museum", described as a cross between a museum, theme park and candy shop, with dessert-themed art pieces and installations. Located in Pasay, Metro Manila in the Philippines at Conrad Manila within the SM Mall of Asia complex, and inspired by similar exhibitions like the Museum of Ice Cream, it is the first exhibit of its kind in Asia.

References

External links 

Official website of the Dessert Museum

Museums in Pasay
Buildings and structures in Pasay
SM Mall of Asia
Art museums and galleries in the Philippines